The UCSC Silicon Valley Initiatives are a series of educational and research activities which together increase the presence of the University of California in Silicon Valley. To that end, UC Santa Cruz has set up a 90,000 square-foot satellite campus called the University of Santa Cruz Silicon Valley Campus (SVC), currently located on Bowers street in Santa Clara, California, where it has been since April 2016 The Initiatives, still in the early stages of their development, have had ambitious hopes attached to them by UCSC, among them the possibility of a home for the University's long-planned graduate school of management and the Bio|Info|Nano R&D Institute. It currently houses professional the SVLink incubator-accelerator  program, programs and a distance education site for the UCSC Baskin School of Engineering, the UCSC Silicon Valley Extension, the Office of Industry Alliances and Technology Commercialization leadership, and the University of California's online learning program, UC Scout.

Graduate programs 
The Silicon Valley Campus offers several master's programs designed to support the diverse workforce in the Silicon Valley area. It currently houses an M.S. program in Games and Playable Media and an M.S. program in Serious Games, with an M.S. in Natural Language Processing and M.S. in Human-Computer Interaction in development, with a tentative launch date of Fall 2020.

M.S. in Games and Playable Media 
The M.S. in Games and Playable Media is run by the UCSC Baskin School of Engineering and is among the top-ranked programs in the world. The program spans five quarters and combines technical and design innovation to explore a variety of new possible playable experiences.

M.S. in Serious Games 
The M.S. in Serious Games was established in the fall of 2019 and is country's first graduate program in serious games, which are games designed to accomplish measurable social goals, rather than just serve as entertainment. UCSC has said that it hopes the program will help students enter what has become a rapidly growing industry with applications for health care, therapy, security, the military, education, and product creation. The new program spans five quarters and trains students in game design, game technology, eliciting and integrating subject matter knowledge, designing and conducting efficacy measures, effective teamwork, and career planning, and will culminate in a capstone project.

Innovation, Entrepreneurship, and Research 
Part of the mission of the Silicon Valley Campus is to create a space where academic researchers can connect with global industry leaders, with hopes that these connections will lead to increased innovation and the development of life-enhancing technologies. To this end, the Silicon valley initiatives have sought to create a number of opportunities for UC affiliates to work with industry leaders. Engineering students often intern in the Silicon Valley, and many of the school's alumni have joined or founded companies in the area. The SVC also serves as a venue for public talks by faculty and local leaders, like the Kraw Lecture Series on Science and Technology. It also houses a number of research centers, institutes, and other ventures.

SV Link 
SVLink is a non-profit run by the University of California, Santa Cruz and managed by the Office of Industry Alliances and Technology Commercialization (IATC) at the Silicon Valley Campus. It was established in 2018 to help startup companies with new innovations get ready for commercialization. Applications are reviewed by a committee of UCSC staff and faculty members and priority is given to companies that are connected to the University of California, but all companies are welcome to apply. SVLink was partly funded a $2.2 million state allocation to UC Santa Cruz (California Assembly Bill (AB) 2664) to fund innovation and entrepreneurship. Another incubator/accelerator program, Startup Sandbox, does similar work in the Santa Cruz region and was also partly funded by the same state allocation.

Silicon Valley Regional Data Trust 
The SVRDT is a project by sociologist Rebecca London and Professor Emeritus Rod Ogawa to use data-sharing to identify common problems students are facing in the Santa Cruz, Santa Clara, and San Mateo counties and find solutions to address them. The trust enables teachers, principals, social workers, public and mental health professionals, judges, and probation officers to share information in real time about students and the services they are receiving to better address their needs.

Center for Games and Playable Media 
The Center for Games and Playable Media (CGPM) was established in 2010 and promotes research into both games for entertainment and serious games for training and rehabilitation. It houses five game-related research labs that study a diversity of games, working on projects that range from artificial intelligence to level design. Its Expressive Intelligence Studio, dedicated to exploring the intersection of artificial intelligence, art, and design, is one of the largest technical game research groups in the world.

Cyber-Physical Systems Research Center (CPSRC) 
This research center studies cyber-physical systems, which rely on computational algorithms integrated with physical components. The goal of the center is to facilitate collaborative research on these large and complicated systems within UCSC and with industrial partners. It studies, among other things, autonomous systems, human sensing, smart cities and buildings, power grids, agriculture, manufacturing, transportation, and connected health.

Data, Discovery, and Decisions (D3) Research Center 
The D3 Research Center opened in 2017 and is led by Professor of Computer Science Lise Getoor. It engages with foundational computational, mathematical, and statistical research to make it easier to make decisions and discoveries based on complex data sets. The goal of the center is to develop open-source tools for addressing the challenges big data presents, and to create a platform for partnering with the industries in the Silicon Valley area in the field of data science.

The Center for Research in Open Source Software (CROSS) 
This center is designed to facilitate the transfer of student research into industry via open-source projects. It was founded after UCSC student Sage Weil successfully founded the distributed storage platform Ceph. Its goal is to create a path for graduate students to become entrepreneurs in the tech industry, drawing on the expertise of Silicon Valley experts.

The Genomics Institute 
The Genomics Institute was established in 2014 to research ways to employ intelligent diagnostics to get cures to people more quickly and to understand the genetic underpinnings of a variety of diseases and conditions. It creates open-source genomics platforms and other technologies to find evolutionary patterns and the genetic underpinnings of disease, and it is committed to openly sharing its innovations to promote a healthier society. The institute has close partnerships with industries in the area, and research at the institute has led to the creation of several new companies, including Five3 Genomics, Maverix Biomics, MagArray, Two Pore Guys, and Dovetail Genomics.

The Network Management and Operations (NMO) Lab 
The NMO lab is funded partly through an industry partnership with Cisco and partners with Cisco engineers to work on real problems in operational networks.

Storage Systems Research Center (SSRC) 
The SSRC focuses on file and storage systems, and particularly on the security and reliability in such systems. It has active projects in archival storage, large-scale distributed storage systems, creating file systems for more advanced storage devices, and managing scalable metadata. The center frequently collaborates with local industry.

See also
University of California, Santa Cruz
Jack Baskin School of Engineering

External links
UC Santa Cruz
Silicon Valley Initiatives web site
SVI Initiatives:
Advanced Studies Laboratories 
Bio | Info | Nano R&D Institute

References

Silicon Valley Initiatives
Business schools in California